Dingle Road railway station is a railway station in the town of Penarth in the Vale of Glamorgan, South Wales.

All passenger trains serving this station are operated by Transport for Wales as part of the Valley Lines network.

History
The Taff Vale Railway opened the station in 1904. It had two platforms until 1967, when British Rail closed the Down platform and reduced the line from double to single track.

Service
Monday to Saturday daytimes there are four trains per hour to Cardiff Central and beyond to ( and hourly through to ) northbound and Penarth southbound. On Monday to Saturday evenings there are two trains per hour. On Sundays there is only one train every two hours (to Penarth & Cardiff Central only) and no late evening service.

References

External links

Railway stations in the Vale of Glamorgan
DfT Category F2 stations
Former Taff Vale Railway stations
Railway stations in Great Britain opened in 1904
Railway stations served by Transport for Wales Rail